Benjamin Schenck Mansion, also known as Schenck Mansion Bed and Breakfast, is a historic home located at Vevay, Switzerland County, Indiana. It was built in 1874, and is a two-story, Italianate / Second Empire style brick mansion on a full basement. The house has over 12,000 square feet of space. It features a four-story tower with a mansard roof measuring 74 feet tall.  The house was restored in 2000 and is operated as a bed and breakfast.

It was listed on the National Register of Historic Places in 2002. In 2020, the home was sold to tattoo artist Kat Von D, who announced her plans to move from Los Angeles, California to Indiana and live in the mansion.

References

External links
Schenck Mansion Bed and Breakfast website

Bed and breakfasts in Indiana
Houses on the National Register of Historic Places in Indiana
Italianate architecture in Indiana
Second Empire architecture in Indiana
Houses completed in 1874
Buildings and structures in Switzerland County, Indiana
National Register of Historic Places in Switzerland County, Indiana